Karianne Bråthen (born 2 August 1974) is a Norwegian politician.

She was elected deputy representative to the Storting from the constituency of Nordland for the period 2021–2025, for the Labour  Party. She replaced Bjørnar Skjæran in the Storting from 2021 while Skjæran is government minister.

She has previously been mayor in Øksnes.

References

1974 births
Living people
People from Øksnes
Labour Party (Norway) politicians
Members of the Storting
Mayors of places in Nordland